Virginia Margaret Spate  (1937 – 12 August 2022) was a British-born Australian art historian and academic.

Spate was born in the United Kingdom in 1937. She lived in Burma as a child until her family was evacuated during the Pacific War. In 1951, she settled in Australia, where she studied a Bachelor of Arts degree in history and fine arts at the University of Melbourne, graduating in 1961. She studied and lectured in art history at the University of Cambridge, receiving a Master of Arts. She then received a PhD from Bryn Mawr College in Pennsylvania, United States.

In 1978, Spate was appointed J. W. Power Professor and Director of the Power Institute of Fine Arts at the University of Sydney. She retired in 2004, and became a professor emeritus of the institute. She was elected fellow of the Australian Academy of the Humanities in 1981 and appointed Slade Professor of Fine Art at the University of Cambridge in 1998–99.

Spate was made a Companion of the Order of Australia (AC)—Australia's highest civilian honour—on 11 June 2018, for eminent service to higher education, particularly to art history and theory and to the advanced study of the contemporary arts, as an academic, author and curator, and as a role model for young art historians.

She died on 12 August 2022.

Works

References

1937 births
2022 deaths
Australian art historians
Women art historians
University of Melbourne alumni
University of Melbourne women
Alumni of the University of Cambridge
Bryn Mawr College alumni
Academic staff of the University of Sydney
Companions of the Order of Australia
British emigrants to Australia
Fellows of the Australian Academy of the Humanities